Eremophila dendritica is a flowering plant in the figwort family, Scrophulariaceae and is endemic to the south of Australia. It is a low, shrub with many tangled branches. Its branches, leaves and flowers are densely covered with hairs giving them a felty texture.

Description
The branches are covered with a layer of white to yellowish branched hairs. The leaves are arranged in pairs, are almost circular, covered with a dense layer of hairs giving them a felty texture and are mostly  in diameter.

The flowers are borne singly in leaf axils and lack a stalk. The petal tube is lilac-coloured on the outside and white with faint spots on the inside. The inside and outside of the tube are both hairy, except for the inner surface of the petal lobes which is glabrous. The 4 stamens are fully enclosed in the petal tube.

Taxonomy and naming
The species was first formally described by Robert Chinnock in 2007 and the description was published in Eremophila and Allied Genera: A Monograph of the Plant Family Myoporaceae. The specific epithet (dendritica) is a Latin word meaning "tree-like" referring to the branched hairs on the leaves.

Distribution and habitat
This eremophila has been recorded from near Commonwealth Hill Station in South Australia and from Rawlinna to the Plumridge Lakes area in Western Australia. It grows in brown clay soils, sometimes in scattered bluebush shrubland.

Conservation status
Eremophila dendritica is classified as "Priority Two" by the Western Australian Government Department of Parks and Wildlife meaning that is poorly known and from only one or a few locations.

Use in horticulture
The woolly leaves and massed flowers of this eremophila make it useful as a contrast with other small shrubs. It is only known to have been propagated by grafting onto Myoporum species and in this case will grow in most soils. It grows best in full sun, requires little watering in droughts and is only slightly damaged by frosts when young.

References

dendritica
Eudicots of Western Australia
Plants described in 2007
Flora of South Australia
Taxa named by Robert Chinnock